Tillandsia yuncharaensis is a species in the genus Tillandsia. This species is endemic to Bolivia.

References

yuncharaensis
Flora of Bolivia